Carlton Harry Colwell (June 27, 1926 – August 9, 2021) was an American politician in the state of Georgia. He served in the Georgia House of Representatives for 30 years, from 1965 to 1995.

Early life and education
Colwell was born in Blairsville, Georgia, in a family with six sons. His father was a farmer.

In 1944, Colwell graduated from Union County High School. He began working as contractor in 1956, founding with his brothers the Colwell Construction Company, after working for General Motors.

Political career
Colwell was elected to the Georgia House of Representatives as a Democrat from Union County in 1964. Halfway through his first term, the state redrew its legislative districts to equalize population in accordance with the Supreme Court's ruling in Reynolds v. Sims.

Colwell served continuously until his retirement from office in 1995. By his final term, he was the chair of the State Institutions & Property Committee, which has authority over Georgia's prison system.

Death
Colwell died on August 9, 2021, at the age of 95.

References

1926 births
2021 deaths
People from Blairsville, Georgia
Democratic Party members of the Georgia House of Representatives
20th-century American politicians
General Motors people